Expert in a Dying Field is the third studio album by New Zealand indie rock band the Beths. It was released on 16 September 2022 by Carpark Records.

Critical reception

Expert in a Dying Field received acclaim from music critics. At Metacritic, which assigns a normalised rating out of 100 to reviews from mainstream critics, the album received an average score of 83 based on 15 reviews.

Jonathan Wright with God Is in the TV states "It appears to be in the band's DNA that they can keep creating this brand of addictive indie pop songs that all feel like essential additions to their already strong back catalogue." states the album is "brimming with smart power-pop that brings to mind the casual virtuosity of '90s Aimee Mann and the bonhomie and euphoria of Superchunk and Fountains of Wayne."

Track listing

Charts

Weekly charts

Year-end charts

References

2022 albums
Albums recorded in a home studio
The Beths albums
Carpark Records albums